Yassıören is a village in the Başmakçı District, Afyonkarahisar Province, Turkey. Its population is 335 (2021). It is located south of the district capital of Başmakçı and northeast of Akpınar, near Lake Acıgöl.

References

Villages in Başmakçı District